Gard Island is an island located in Maumee Bay, in Monroe County, Michigan. It was labeled "Guard Island", along with Indian Island and Squaw Island, on a 1900 USGS map of the area. A 1938 map showed it alongside Indian Island, Odeen Island, and Woodtick Island.

References

Islands of Monroe County, Michigan